Sweden competed at the 1936 Summer Olympics in Berlin, Germany. 171 competitors, 163 men and 8 women, took part in 84 events in 17 sports.

Medalists

Athletics

Boxing

Canoeing

Cycling

Five cyclists, all men, represented Sweden in 1936.

Individual road race
 Arne Berg
 Berndt Carlsson
 Ingvar Ericsson
 Sven Johansson

Team road race
 Arne Berg
 Berndt Carlsson
 Ingvar Ericsson
 Sven Johansson

Time trial
 Jonas Persson

Diving

Equestrian

Fencing

13 fencers, 11 men and 2 women, represented Sweden in 1936.

Men's foil
 Bengt Ljungquist
 Ivar Tingdahl
 Hubert de Bèsche

Men's épée
 Hans Drakenberg
 Hans Granfelt
 Gustaf Dyrssen

Men's team épée
 Hans Granfelt, Sven Thofelt, Gustav Almgren, Gustaf Dyrssen, Hans Drakenberg, Birger Cederin

Men's sabre
 Ivar Tingdahl
 Hubert de Bèsche
 Bengt Ljungquist

Men's team sabre
 Bengt Ljungquist, Knut Nordholm, Hubert de Bèsche, Ivar Tingdahl, Carl Johan Wachtmeister

Women's foil
 Berit Granquist
 Ebba Gripenstedt

Football

Summary

Round of 16

Modern pentathlon

Three male pentathletes represented Sweden in 1936.

 Sven Thofelt
 Georg von Boisman
 Ebbe Gyllenstierna

Rowing

Sweden had five rowers participate in one out of seven rowing events in 1936.

 Men's coxed four
 Erik Johansson
 Carl Sjöblom
 Lars Larsson
 Harry Sköld
 Sven Tisell (cox)

Sailing

Shooting

Seven shooters represented Sweden in 1936. Torsten Ullman won a gold medal in 50 m pistol and a bronze in the 25 m pistol.

25 m rapid fire pistol
 Torsten Ullman
 Helge Meuller
 Henrik Lönnberg

50 m pistol
 Torsten Ullman
 Helge Meuller
 Gustaf Bergström

50 m rifle, prone
 Bertil Rönnmark
 Erland Koch
 Karl August Larsson

Swimming

Water polo

Summary

Weightlifting

Wrestling

Art competitions

References

Nations at the 1936 Summer Olympics
1936
1936 in Swedish sport